Frank Vincent Tilsley (5 May 1904 – 16 March 1957) was a British novelist, broadcaster, and television dramatist. Tilsley became a full-time author after the publication of his first novel, Plebeian's Progress (1933), and subsequently published over twenty novels, including She Was There Too (1938), Pleasure Beach (1944), Champion Road (1948), Heaven and Herbert Common (1953), and Brother Nap (1954). His novel Mutiny (1958) was adapted for film and released as H.M.S. Defiant, starring Alec Guinness and Dirk Bogarde, in 1962. Tilsley was also a frequent radio broadcaster and writer of popular television shows including The Makepeace Story.

Life 
Tilsley was born in Lancashire and grew up in Manchester, where he was educated at Chapel Street Council School, Levenshulme. He worked in a variety of fields, including as an accountant's clerk and a schoolteacher. His first novel, Plebeian's Progress (1933), was met warmly by critics and was "highly valued for the authenticity of its critical depiction of working-class conditions in a period of economic depression." Following the success of his debut novel, Tilsley was able to write full-time. He continued writing until his death in 1957, publishing over twenty novels. During World War II, he served in the RAF as a war reporter, and was given the rank of Squadron Leader. After the war, Tilsley joined the BBC, where he wrote for both radio and television.

Selected work 

 
 
 
  .
  .
 
  .
  .
 
 
  .
  .
 
 
  .
  .
 
 
  .
 
  .
  .
  .
  .
  
 
  , .

Bibliography

Notes

References

 <div style="margin-left:6em">
 

  – via Newspapers.com.
 
 
 

 

  

 

 
 
 

 
Online:
 
 
 
 

  Retrieved May 4, 2019 – via BBC Genome Project. ; .
 
 
 
 

Articles:
 
 

  .

1904 births
1957 deaths
20th-century British novelists
British broadcasters
British male novelists